Santa Maria, officially the Municipality of Santa Maria,  (formerly Imelda), is a 5th class municipality in the province of Romblon, Philippines. According to the 2020 census, it has a population of 8,989 people.

History
Santa Maria was known in Spanish times as Cagbagacay, after a bamboo plant called "bagacay" in the local dialect, which was in abundance in the area. Back then it was still a barrio of Guintigui-an town. In 1910, barrio Cagbagacay was renamed Concepcion after its patron the Immaculada Concepcion.

On September 12, 1982, barrio Concepcion (Norte) together with barrios Bonga and Concepcion Sur were organized and created into a new municipality by virtue of Batas Pambansa Blg. 234, authored by Assemblyman Nemesio Ganan Jr. The new municipality was named "Imelda", in honor of then First Lady Imelda Marcos, as well as to distinguish the town from Concepcion municipality on Maestro de Campo Island, also in Romblon.

After the People Power Revolution in 1986 which toppled the regime of dictator Ferdinand Marcos, the town was renamed Santa Maria on April 17, 1988, by virtue of Republic Act No. 6651, again in honor of its patron the Immaculate Conception of the Blessed Virgin Mary. Three new barangays were added to the municipality:  San Isidro, Paroyhog, and Santo Nino.

Geography
Situated on the eastern side of Tablas Island, Santa Maria faces the Sibuyan Sea. It is bounded in the north by the municipality of San Agustin, in the south by the municipality of Alcantara, in the west by the municipality of Odiongan and in the east by Romblon Pass. It is generally mountainous with a limited portion of the plain area along the coast. The town is considered one of the most peaceful areas in the province.

Climate

Barangays
Santa Maria is politically subdivided into 6 barangays.

 Bonga
 Concepcion Norte (Poblacion)
 Concepcion Sur
 Paroyhog
 Santo Niño
 San Isidro

Demographics

According to the 2015 census, it has a population of 8,508 people. Onhan, also known as Taga-onhan or Inunhan (Alcantaranhon style), is the native language of majority of its inhabitants, while Romblomanon or Ini is the native tongue in the two northern barangays of Bonga and Santo Niño (Bitaugan).

Economy

Government

Pursuant to Chapter II, Title II, Book III of Republic Act 7160 or the Local Government Code of 1991, the municipal government is composed of a mayor (alkalde), a vice mayor (bise alkalde) and members (kagawad) of the legislative branch Sangguniang Bayan alongside a secretary to the said legislature, all of which are elected to a three-year term and are eligible to run for three consecutive terms.

The incumbent mayor is Lorilie "Bic-Bic" Fabon y Manito y Fetalino while the incumbent vice mayor is Dennis Corpin y Fortu, nephew of the late Calatrava mayor Prudencio Fortu.

Sister cities
  Makati: On February 8, 2008, Santa Maria Mayor Fred Hernandez and Makati Mayor Jejomar Binay signed a sisterhood relationship agreement between the two local government units.

See also
List of renamed cities and municipalities in the Philippines

References

External links
Santa Maria Profile at PhilAtlas.com
Santa Maria, Romblon Profile - Cities and Municipalities Competitive Index
[ Philippine Standard Geographic Code]
2007 Philippine Census Information

Municipalities of Romblon